Peace on Earth is a sculpture by Jacques Lipchitz, installed in Los Angeles, California.

References 

Downtown Los Angeles
Outdoor sculptures in Greater Los Angeles